Sèvremont is a commune in the department of Vendée, western France. The municipality was established on 1 January 2016 by merger of the former communes of La Flocellière, Les Châtelliers-Châteaumur, La Pommeraie-sur-Sèvre and Saint-Michel-Mont-Mercure.

Population

See also 
Communes of the Vendée department

References 

Communes of Vendée
Populated places established in 2016
2016 establishments in France
States and territories established in 2016